The following is a list the Dranoff International Two Piano Competition Winners. The competition was founded in 1987 by the Dranoff International Two Piano Foundation. The Competition has been a member of the World Federation of International Music Competitions since 1997.

2013

1st Prize Winners -	Duo Yamamoto

2nd Prize Winners -	Duo Yoo & Kim

3rd Prize Winners -	Duo imPuls

2008

1st Prize Winners -	Silivanova-Puryzhinskiy

2nd Prize Winners -	Susan & Sarah Wang

3rd Prize Winners -	Piano Duo Humburger

2005 

1st Prize Winner -      Seo & Kato

2nd Prize Winner -      Piano Duo Varshavski and Shapiro

3rd Prize Winner -	De Stefano Piano Duo

2003

1st Prize Winner -	Tengstrandt and Sun Piano Duo

2nd Prize Winner -	Duo Chipak & Kushnir

3rd Prize Winner - 	Duo Antithesis

2001

1st Prize Winner -	Duo D’Accord

2nd Prize Winner -	Makarova-Koltakov Duo

3rd Prize Winner -	Mogilevsky-Smolina Piano Duo

1999

1st Prize Winners -	Trivella Duo

2nd Prize Winners -	Duo Koltyar-Shifrin

3rd Prize Winners -	Horus Duo

1997

1st Prize Winners -	Duo Turgeon

Edward Turgeon and Anne Louise-Turgeon

2nd Prize Winners -	Genova & Dimitrov
Genova & Dimitrov Piano Duo
Genova & Dimitrov Piano Duo

3rd Prize Winners -	Alexeytchuck and Kot

1995

1st Prize Winners -	Marton and Batzner

2nd Prize Winners -	Piano Duo Zacharov

3rd Prize Winners -	Duo Van Veen

1993

1st Prize Winners -	Elkina Piano Duo

2nd Prize Winners -	Ishikawa and Kratzert 

3rd Prize Winners -	Bergman Duo

1991

1st Prize Co-Winners -	Lisitsa and Kuznetsoff

1st Prize Co-Winners -	Duo Zheleznov

2nd Prize Not Awarded

3rd Prize Winners -	Lewis & Perry Duo

                                             
1989   

1st Prize Winners -	Goldina and Lumbrozo 

2nd Prize Winners -	Klavier Duo Stentzl

3rd Prize Winners -	Anne Marie and Monique Mot

1987

1st Prize Winners -	Morel-Nemish

2nd Prize Winners -	Hecht-Shapiro

3rd Prize Winners -	Goldina and Lumbrozo

Piano competitions